Bjerknes may refer to:
Carl Anton Bjerknes (1825-1903), Norwegian mathematician and physicist
Vilhelm Bjerknes (1862–1951), Norwegian physicist and meteorologist, son of Carl Anton
Jacob Bjerknes (1897–1975), Norwegian-American meteorologist, son of Vilhelm
Bjerknes (lunar crater), named in honour of Vilhelm